Desi Obbattu (also "Bele holige", Kannada: ಹೋಳಿಗೆ, Konkani: पुरणपोळी, Gujarati: પોળ) is a traditional type of sweet flatbread popular in the Indian states of Karnataka, Maharashtra, Gujarat, and Goa.

Desi Obbattu is generally prepared for special occasions and festivals. There are many varieties of Obbattu including: peanut, sugar, coconut, sesame and groundnut flavors. The dish is produced using a sweet filling inside a flour dough. This is then rolled out and cooked on a hot griddle, usually with ghee.

References

Indian cuisine